= D- =

D- means:

- Placed before a U.S. state, usually in parentheses, indicates the person it applies to is a Democratic Party politician of that state. "R-" is used for the Republican Party.
- An academic grade given by certain institutions. Slightly better than an F and slightly worse than a D. See Grading in education.
- A prefix signifying chirality of a molecule

== See also ==
- Rep.
- Sen.
